The Richard J. Bolte Sr. Award recognizes "outstanding contributions by a leader who provides products or services vital to the continuing growth and development of the chemical and molecular sciences community". The medal is presented annually under the sponsorship of the Science History Institute (formerly the Chemical Heritage Foundation) at its annual Heritage Day.   The inaugural award was presented to Richard J. Bolte, Sr., founder and chairman of BDP International, in 2006, as the Award for Supporting Industries. It was renamed the Richard J. Bolte Sr. Award for Supporting Industries in 2007.

Recipients 
The award is given yearly and was first presented in 2006.

 Steven Holland, 2020
 Frederick Frank, 2019
 W. Graham Richards, 2018
 Peter Young, 2017
 Roy T. Eddleman, 2016
 Abdul Aziz Bin Abdullah Al Zamil, 2015
 Atsushi Horiba, 2014
 Alan Walton, 2013
 G. Steven Burrill, 2012
 Lawrence B. Evans, 2011
 C. Berdon Lawrence, 2010
 David and Alice Schwartz, 2009
 Jerry M. Sudarsky, 2008
 Eugene Garfield, 2007
 Richard J. Bolte, Sr., 2006

Photo Gallery

See also

 List of chemistry awards

References

Chemistry awards